A64 or A-64 may refer to:

Roads:
 A64 road (England), a road connecting Leeds and Scarborough
 A64 motorway (France), a road connecting Toulouse and Bayonne
 A64 motorway (Germany), a road connecting the city of Luxembourg and Trier
 A64 highway (Spain), a road connecting the Autovía A-64 junction 367 km and Oviedo

Other uses:
 A further abbreviation of AMD64, a CPU architecture
 An Athlon 64 CPU
 A64 system on a chip designed by Allwinner Technology
 A64 (emulator), a Commodore 64 emulator for the Amiga
 A64, the code for the Benoni Defense in the Encyclopaedia of Chess Openings